Savvas is a Greek given name. Notable people with the given name include:

Savvas the New of Kalymnos (1862–1947), Greek patron saint
Savvas Chamberlain, Canadian scientist, inventor, professor, and entrepreneur
Savvas Constantinou (born 1971), Cypriot football goalkeeper
Savvas Exouzidis (born 1981), Greek footballer
Savvas Gentsoglou (born 1990), Greek football player
Savvas Houvartas, Cypriot guitarist and songwriter
Savvas Kofidis (born 1961), Greek football coach and former midfielder player
Savvas Moudouroglou (born 1991), Greek football striker
Savvas Panavoglou (born 1974), Greek discus thrower
Savvas Pantelidis (born 1965), Greek football head coach and former player
Savvas Poursaitidis (born 1976) Cypriot footballer 
Savvas Saritzoglou (born 1971), Greek hammer thrower
Savvas Savva (born 1958), Cypriot composer, musicologist and pianist
Savvas Siatravanis (born 1992), Greek football midfielder
Savvas Tsabouris (born 1986), Greek football player
Savvas Tsitouridis (born 1954), Greek politician
Savvas Ysatis (born 1968), Greek electronic musician

See also
Sava (name)
Sabbas